Madeleine Pelletier (18 May 1874 – 29 December 1939) was a French psychiatrist, first-wave feminist, and political activist. Born in Paris, Pelletier frequented socialist and anarchist groups in her adolescence. She became a doctor in her twenties, overcoming a large educational gap, and was France's first woman to receive a doctorate in psychiatry. Pelletier joined freemasonry, the French Section of the Workers' International, and came to lead a feminist association. She set out to join the October Revolution but returned disillusioned. In France, she continued to advocate for feminist and communist causes, and wrote numerous articles, essays, and literary works, even following a stroke in 1937 which made her hemiplegic. Pelletier was charged with having performed an abortion in 1939 despite her condition precluding her ability to perform this act. She was placed in a mental asylum where her health deteriorated and she died of a second stroke later that year.

Biography
Pelletier originally trained as an anthropologist studying the relationship between skull size and intelligence after Paul Broca with Charles Letourneau and Léonce Manouvrier. When she left anthropology she attacked the concept of skull size as a determinant of intelligence distinguishing the sexes.

Following her break with anthropology Pelletier went on to become a psychiatrist. In 1903, Pelletier conducted a campaign with the support of the feminist newspaper La Fronde to support the eligibility of women for all types of medical specialisation, most relevantly to the examination for psychiatric internships.

She was also notable as a female Freemason. Pelletier was a member of the La Nouvelle Jérusalem lodge, becoming a member in 1904. The lodge had both male and female members, and, although politically active, she was often at odds with her lodge in her efforts to promote the emancipation of women.

Pelletier was partially paralyzed by a stroke in 1937. However, she continued to openly practice abortion, and was arrested in 1939. Following her arrest she was interned in an asylum and her physical and mental health deteriorated. She died within the year.

See also
History of feminism
List of suffragists and suffragettes
Women's suffrage

References

Sources
Allen, C. S. (2003). "Sisters of Another Sort: Freemason Women in Modern France, 1725–1940". The Journal of Modern History, 75: 783–835.
Gordon, F. (1990). The Integral Feminist, Madeleine Pelletier, 1874 – 1939, Feminism, Socialism and Medicine. Polity Press
Sowerwine, C. (1991). "Activism and Sexual Identity – the Life and Words of Pelletier, Madeleine (1874–1939)". Mouvement Social, 157: 9–32.
Sowerwine, C. (2003). "Woman’s Brain, Man’s Brain: feminism and anthropology in late nineteenth-century France". Women’s History Review, 12:289–307.
 Felicia Gordon, "Convergence and conflict: anthropology, psychiatry and feminism in the early writings of Madeleine Pelletier (1874—1939)," History of Psychiatry, 19,2 (2008), 141–162.

External links
 Some of her texts available online (in French)

1874 births
1939 deaths
French autobiographers
French anarchists
French anthropologists
French women anthropologists
French biographers
French Communist Party members
French essayists
French feminists
French Freemasons
French women novelists
French political writers
French psychiatrists
French women psychiatrists
French suffragists
Free love advocates
French travel writers
French socialist feminists
Socialist Party (France) politicians
French women physicians
French women essayists
Women travel writers
Women autobiographers
Women biographers
Communist women writers
20th-century French women writers